Penmaenpool railway station at Penmaenpool in Gwynedd, North Wales, was formerly a station on the  branch of the Aberystwith and Welsh Coast Railway, part of the Ruabon to Barmouth Line. It closed to passengers on Monday 18 January 1965.

It had two platforms and a passing loop, plus an engine shed approximately half a mile west of the station next to the former fireman's house. According to the Official Handbook of Stations the following classes of traffic were being handled at this station in 1956: G, P, F, L, H & C and there was no crane.

The site today
The station is now occupied by a car park, but the original station signal box remains next to the Penmaenpool Toll Bridge and was used by the RSPB as an observation post and information centre for the local nature reserve.  The former station master's house, ticket office and waiting room has been converted into an annexe for the George III hotel. Photographs of the station in its operating days are on display in the bar/reception area of the hotel.

The former trackbed through the site is now in use as a footpath, the Llwybr Mawddach (or "Mawddach Trail").

References

Sources
 
 
 
 Penmaenpool station on navigable 1946 O. S. map
 Photos of Penmaenpool Station at Dolgellau.net
 Photo of the engine shed
 The RSPB at Mawddach

Further reading

Disused railway stations in Gwynedd
Beeching closures in Wales
Dolgellau
Railway stations in Great Britain opened in 1865
Railway stations in Great Britain closed in 1965
Former Cambrian Railway stations
1865 establishments in Wales
1965 disestablishments in Wales